Orense Sporting Club is a professional football club from the city of Machala, Ecuador that plays in Serie A.

Achievements
Serie B
Winner (1): 2019

Players

Current squad
As of January 28, 2020.

References

External links
Official website 

Association football clubs established in 2009
Football clubs in Ecuador
2009 establishments in Ecuador